The Kazakhstan men's national volleyball team represents Kazakhstan in international volleyball competitions and friendly matches.

Results

World Championship
 2002 – 19th place
 2006 – 21st place

World League
 2015 – 28th place
 2016 – 35th place
 2017 – 35th place

Challenger Cup
 2018 – 5th place

Asian Games

Asian Championship

Asian Cup
Asian Men's Volleyball Cup

 2008 – Did not qualify
 2010 – 7th place
 2012 – Did not qualify
 2014 –  3rd place
 2016 – 5th place
 2018 – 7th place
 2022 – Withdrew

Current squad

The following is the Kazakhstani roster in the 2021 Asian Championship in Japan.

Head Coach:

References

External links
Sports123

Volleyball
National men's volleyball teams
Volleyball in Kazakhstan
Men's sport in Kazakhstan